Events in the year 2012 in Chad.

Incumbents 

 President: Idriss Déby
 Prime Minister: Emmanuel Nadingar

Events

January 

 January 11 – Senegal denies Chad's request to extradite former dictator Hissène Habré to Belgium for sentencing.

May 

 May 17 – The World Bank approves $34 million to boost food production in the agricultural and livestock sectors of the Chadian economy.

July 

 July 24 – Dozens of elephants are slaughtered by poachers in southwestern Chad.

August 

 August 3 – President Déby sends troops to find and capture poachers following the previous month's poaching incident.

October 

 October 12 – The United Nations Human Rights Council begins to move refugees from the Central African Republic from Chad to new sites after floods.

References 

 
Years of the 21st century in Chad
2010s in Chad
Chad
Chad